Marchantiales is an order of thallose liverworts (also known as "complex thalloid liverworts") that includes species like Marchantia polymorpha, a widespread plant often found beside rivers, and Lunularia cruciata, a common and often troublesome weed in moist, temperate gardens and greenhouses.

As in other bryophytes, the gametophyte generation is dominant, with the sporophyte existing as a short-lived part of the life cycle, dependent upon the gametophyte.

The genus Marchantia is often used to typify the order, although there are also many species of Asterella and species of the genus Riccia are more numerous. 
The majority of genera are characterized by the presence of (a) special stalked vertical branches called archegoniophores  or carpocephala, and (b) sterile cells celled elaters inside the sporangium.

Phylogeny (extant Marchantiales)
Based on the work by Villarreal et al. 2015

Phylogeny (extant and extinct Marchantiales) 
Extinct complex thalloid liverworts are often represented by coalified compressions that preserve superficial morphological traits and do not allow exhaustively analysing their fine anatomy; though, in exceptional cases, fossils might preserve cell details. 

Generally speaking, extinct Marchantiales - which commonly date back to the Mesozoic - can be grouped in Marchantia-like and Riccia-like fossils according to their overall morphology. While the phylogenetic relationships among many extinct and extant Marchantiales remain equivocal, it has been suggested that some fossils are closely related to extant Marchantiales. 

Marchantites cyathodoides (Townrow) H. M. Anderson (Middle Triassic), for instance, is a Marchantia-like fossil whose detailed morphological characters (e.g., thallus with midrib, reduced air chambers, rhizoids and ventral scales) suggest a nested position within Marchantiales. Some Riccia-like fossils have even been assigned to families based on their overall morphology and branching patterns, such as the case of Ricciopsis sandaolingensis Li & Sun (Middle Jurassic). The first phylogenetic analyses that include both extinct and extant Marchantiales have further clarified the relationships among these taxa and have revealed new relationships among families. Likewise, the inclusion of fossils in total-evidence analyses implied that some groups of complex thalloid liverworts might be older than previously inferred.

Summary tree based on the work by Flores et al. 2020:

Classification 
Taxonomy based on work by Söderström et al. 2016 and synonyms from Collection of genus-group names in a systematic arrangement. The order Lunulariales, proposed by Long 2006, has been recently re-included in Marchantiales as a family. 
 Aytoniaceae Cavers 1911  [Rebouliaceae; Grimaldiaceae]
 Asterella Palisot De Beauvisage 1805 [Fimbraria Nees 1820 non Fimbriaria Stackhouse 1809; Asterella section Wallichianae Long 2014; Hypenantron Corda 1829; Octokepos Griffith 1849]
 Cryptomitrium Austin ex Underwood 1884 [Platycoaspis Lindberg 1889]
 Mannia Corda 1829 nom. cons. [Grimaldia Raddi 1818 non Schrank 1805; Cyathophora Gray 1821 non Michelin 1843; Neesiella Schiffner 1893b; Duvalia Nees 1818 non Haworth 1812 non Bonpland 1813; Neesia Leman 1825 non Sprengel 1818; Arnelliella Massalongo 1914; Sindonisce Corda 1829]
 Plagiochasma Lehmann & Lindenberg 1832 nom. cons. non Pomel 1883  [Aytonia Forster & Forster 1775; Ruppina Linnaeus; Rupinia (sic) Corda 1829]
 Reboulia Raddi 1818 nom. cons. 
 Cleveaceae Cavers 1911  [Sauteriaceae]
 Athalamia Falconer 1848
 Clevea Lindberg 1868 [Gollaniella Stephani 1905]
 Peltolepis Lindberg 1876
 Sauteria Nees 1838 [Sauchia Kashyap 1916]
 Conocephalaceae Müller ex Grolle 1972 
 Conocephalum Hill 1773 nom. cons. [Conicephala (sic) Wiggers 1780; Conocephalus (sic) Necker ex Dumortier 1822 non Blume 1825 non Thunberg 1815; Anthoconum Palisot De Beauvois 1804; Fegatella Raddi 1818; Hepatica Adanson 1763 non Miller 1754; Hepaticella Leman 1821; Strozzius Gray 1821; Nemoursia Merat 1840; Sandea Lindberg 1884; Conocephalum (Sandea) (Lindberg 1884) Inoue 1976]
 Corsiniaceae Engler 1892
 Corsinia Raddi 1818 [Guentheria Leman 1821 non Sprengel 1826; Tessellina Dumortier 1822 non Dumortier 1874; Brissocarpus Lindenberg 1829]
 Cronisia Berkeley 1857 [Carringtonia Lindberg 1868; Funicularia Trevisan 1877; Boschia Montagne 1856 non Korthals 1844; Myriorrhynchus Lindberg 1884]
 Cyathodiaceae Stotler & Crandall-Stotler 2000
 Cyathodium Kunze ex Lehmann 1834 [Synhymenium Griffith 1849; Synymenium (sic) Hagen 1910; Cyathodium (Metacyathodium) Srivastava & Dixit 1996]
 Dumortieraceae Long 2006 
 Dumortiera Nees 1824 
 Exormothecaceae Müller ex Grolle 1972
 Aitchisoniella Kashyap 1914
 Exormotheca Mitten 1870 [Corbierella Douin & Trabut 1919]
 Stephensoniella Kashyap 1914 non Cernosvitov 1934 non Lastochkin 1935
 Lunulariaceae Klingrräff 1858
Lunularia Adanson 1763
Marchantiaceae Lindley 1836 
 Bucegia Radian 1903 [Radiania Györffy 1927] 
 Marchantia Linnaeus 1753 [Chlamidium Corda 1828; Marchantiopsis Gao & Chang 1982 non Douin & Douin 1918]
 Preissia Corda 1829 [Achiton Corda 1829]
 Monocleaceae Frank 1877  
 Monoclea Hooker 1820
 Monosoleniaceae Inoue 1966 
 Monosolenium Griffith 1849 [Dumortieropsis Horikawa 1934] 
 Oxymitraceae Müller ex Grolle 1972 
 Oxymitra Bischoff ex Lindenberg 1829 non (Blume) Hooker & Thomson 1855  [Pycnoscenus Lindberg 1863 ; Tessellina Dumortier 1874 non Dumortier 1822] 
 Ricciaceae Reichenbach 1828 
 Riccia Linnaeus 1753 [Hemiseuma (Bischoff) von Klinggraeff 1858; Riccia section Hemiseuma Bischoff; Hemiseumata Bischoff Lindley 1847; Riccia (Pteroriccia) (Schuster 1984) Schuster 1985; Pteroriccia Schuster 1984; Thallocarpus Lindberg 1874a; Cryptocarpus Austin 1869 non Kunth 1817 non Dozy & Molk. ex Dozy & Molk. 1846; Angiocarpus Trevisan 1877; Ricciella Braun 1821; Riccinia Trabut 1916]
 Ricciocarpos Corda 1829 [Euriccia Lacouture 1905; Lichenoides Lindley 1847 non Hoffmann 1789 non Barrande 1846; Lemna Rafinesque 1817 non Linnaeus 1753]
 Targioniaceae Dumortier 1829 
 Targionia Linnaeus 1753 non non Hesse 1923 
 Wiesnerellaceae Inoue 1976 
 Wiesnerella Schiffner 1896

References 

 Crandall-Stotler, Barbara J. & Stotler, Raymond E. "Morphology and classification of the Marchantiophyta". page 63 in A. Jonathan Shaw & Bernard Goffinet (Eds.), Bryophyte Biology. (Cambridge: Cambridge University Press:2000). .
 Grolle, Riclef (1983). "Nomina generica Hepaticarum; references, types and synonymies". Acta Botanica Fennica 121, 1-62.

External links 
  Life cycle 
  Photos of various species 
  Additional photos of species
Morphobank project

 
Liverwort orders